The 1952–53 NHL season was the 36th season of the National Hockey League. The Montreal Canadiens were the Stanley Cup winners as they beat the Boston Bruins four games to one in the final series.

League business
The NHL almost had a seventh franchise, as the Cleveland Barons of the American Hockey League applied for a franchise. They were accepted with the proviso that they deposit $425,000 to show good faith, and prove they had sufficient working capital to consort with the other NHL teams. They could not come up with the working capital and transfer of applicants stock to Cleveland residents. As a result, the Barons were told to apply at a later date.

A big deal was made between Toronto and Chicago as the Maple Leafs shipped Al Rollins, Gus Mortson, and Cal Gardner for goaltender Harry Lumley.

Sid Abel was signed by Chicago to be player-coach.

What was rumoured became fact in September when Arthur M. Wirtz and James D. Norris became the new owners of the near bankrupt Chicago Black Hawks.

James E. Norris, owner of the Detroit Red Wings since 1932 and father of James D. Norris, Chicago owner, died of a heart attack on December 4, 1952, and his daughter Marguerite became the owner. She became the first female owner of an NHL franchise since Ida Querrie owned the Toronto St. Patricks in 1923 when her husband Charlie transferred his stock in the team to her to avoid paying Eddie Livingstone any money in Livingstone's lawsuit against him.

NHL on-ice officials changed to orange-coloured uniforms in March 1953. The officials had worn cream-coloured uniforms which were not distinguishable from some team's home-ice uniforms.

Regular season

For the fifth straight season, the Detroit Red Wings lead the league in points. Gordie Howe won the Hart Trophy over Al Rollins, but on the strength of Rollins' goaltending, Chicago made the playoffs for the first time since 1946.

The first television broadcast in Canada of an NHL game occurred on October 11, 1952. It was a French language broadcast of a game between the Montreal Canadiens and Detroit Red Wings with the Canadiens winning 2–1. The French language telecast was produced by 24-year-old Gerald Renaud. On November 1, the first English language broadcast aired, with Foster Hewitt calling the action, starting in the second period because Conn Smythe was concerned that it would cut into the crowds at the arena. Smythe, the Leafs' managing director, sold the Leafs' television rights for a paltry $100 per game.

Highlights
Gump Worsley made his NHL debut October 9, 1952, in goal for the New York Rangers at the Detroit Olympia and lost 5–3, as Ted Lindsay scored in a tip-in on the power play for Worsley's first goal against him. The Production line scored 3 goals that night as Alex Delvecchio and Gordie Howe also had goals. Marty Pavelich scored what proved to be the winning goal.

On November 8, 14,562 fans were in attendance at the Montreal Forum when the Canadiens beat Chicago 6–4. Elmer Lach scored his 200th career goal. Fifty seconds later, after Emile "Butch" Bouchard fed him the puck, Rocket Richard rifled a puck past Al Rollins for his 325th goal, breaking Nels Stewart's record for career goals. It was ten years to the day since Richard had scored his first NHL goal. "Old Poison" sent the following telegram: "Congratulations on breaking record. Hope you will hold it for many seasons. Best of luck to you and rest of team."

When Terry Sawchuk was injured in practice, the Red Wings brought up Glenn Hall and he made his NHL debut on December 27 and played well in a 2–2 tie with Montreal. Hall then picked up his first career shutout January 7, blanking Boston 4–0.

Red Wings General manager Jack Adams got into some trouble on January 18 when, after a 3–2 loss to Montreal, he entered the officials room and argued with referee Red Storey. Dick Irvin, coach of Montreal, was very upset over this and NHL president Clarence Campbell agreed, fining Adams $500.

Gump Worsley got his first career shutout January 11 when the New York Rangers defeated the Canadiens 7–0 in Montreal.

Butch Bouchard Night was held on February 28 and he was presented with a car and a TV set. Detroit spoiled the night with a 4–3 victory.

There was consternation in Toronto when Max Bentley suddenly vanished and was reported back at his home in Delisle, Saskatchewan. Conn Smythe convinced him to return and he did, playing the remaining games of the schedule.

Ted Lindsay scored 4 goals on March 2 as Detroit pummeled Boston by a score of 10–2.

Gordie Howe scored 49 goals to nearly tie Rocket Richard's record. Howe was held off the scoresheet in the final game of the season by Richard's Canadiens. Howe set a new points record for the season with 95 points and won the Art Ross and Hart trophies.

Final standings

Playoffs
In a major upset, first-place Detroit was defeated in the semifinal by the Boston Bruins in six games. In the other semifinal, the fourth-place Chicago Black Hawks, making their first playoff appearance in seven years, took a 3–2 series lead after losing the first two games to the second-place Montreal Canadiens, but could not finish the job, losing in seven games.

Playoff bracket

Semifinals

(1) Detroit Red Wings vs. (3) Boston Bruins

(2) Montreal Canadiens vs. (4) Chicago Black Hawks

Stanley Cup Finals

In the Finals, the Bruins could not continue their winning ways, and lost to Montreal in five games.

After the Finals, the Cleveland Barons of the American Hockey League applied to play a Stanley Cup challenge. The NHL governors turned down the challenge, stating that the Cleveland club operated in a league of lower standing.

Awards

All-Star teams

Player statistics

Scoring leaders
Note: GP = Games played, G = Goals, A = Assists, PTS = Points, PIM = Penalties in minutes

Leading goaltenders

Note: GP = Games played; Min – Minutes played; GA = Goals against; GAA = Goals against average; W = Wins; L = Losses; T = Ties; SO = Shutouts

Coaches
Boston Bruins: Lynn Patrick
Chicago Black Hawks: Sid Abel
Detroit Red Wings: Tommy Ivan
Montreal Canadiens: Dick Irvin
New York Rangers: Bill Cook
Toronto Maple Leafs: Joe Primeau

Debuts
The following is a list of players of note who played their first NHL game in 1952–53 (listed with their first team, asterisk(*) marks debut in playoffs):
Jerry Toppazzini, Boston Bruins
Glenn Hall, Detroit Red Wings
Marcel Bonin, Detroit Red Wings
Ed Litzenberger, Montreal Canadiens
Jacques Plante, Montreal Canadiens
Harry Howell, New York Rangers
Dean Prentice, New York Rangers
Gump Worsley, New York Rangers
Andy Bathgate, New York Rangers
Ron Murphy, New York Rangers
Ron Stewart, Toronto Maple Leafs

Last games
The following is a list of players of note that played their last game in the NHL in 1952–53 (listed with their last team):
Pentti Lund, Boston Bruins
Chuck Rayner, New York Rangers
Pete Babando, New York Rangers

See also
1952-53 NHL transactions
List of Stanley Cup champions
6th National Hockey League All-Star Game
National Hockey League All-Star Game
1952 in sports
1953 in sports

References

 
 
 
 

 

 * 

Notes

External links
Hockey Database for NHL 52–53
NHL.com

 
1952–53 in American ice hockey by league
1952–53 in Canadian ice hockey by league